The paleoethnobotany of the Mapuche focuses on archaeological evidence supporting plant use by past and present Mapuche populations collected from multiple sites in southern Chile and the Patagonia region of Argentina. Paleoethnobotany is the study of fossil and material remains from plants, mostly seeds and residues that can be analyzed from material remains. Data can be collected from archaeological sites with a particular interest in learning about the history of agriculture in a region or the use of plants for either subsistence or medicinal use. The  Mapuche are an indigenous culture native to South America. The archaeological record has revealed that the Mapuche were present in modern-day south-central Chile and southwestern Argentina from at least 500-600 BC. It is also noteworthy, that while collectively the Mapuche (Picunche, Huilliche and Moluche or Nguluche) use this endonym, there are often subsets of the culture that have more specific names based on geographic location as well as different ecological niches (See Mapuche: Etymology).

Regional sites in South America

Central and Southern Chile

Cerro del Inga 
The Promaucaes, a Mapuche group,  were the last group of indigenous peoples to occupy this site in modern-day Chile in the Cachapoal Valley. Archeobotanical analysis was conducted at these sites in relation to pre-Hispanic cultures dominated by  the Incan civilization. This site serves as a point of resistance to both Incan occupation as well as Spanish colonization. Analysis of seeds and macromaterials from soil reveal the following plants were present at this site. Culitivated plants included: Maize (Zea mays), Madi (Madia chilensis), Quinoa (Chenopodium quinua), Sunflower (Helianthus sp. cf. tuberosum), Gourd (Lagenaria sp.). Fruiting bushes and trees included: Guillave (Echinopsis chilensis) Michay (Berberis sp.), Boldo (Peumus boldus), Quilo (Muehlenbeckia hastulata) Grape (Vitis sp.), Blackberry (Rubus sp.), Cocito, Palm Nut (Jubaea chilensis). Legumes included: Unidentified, small (Astragalus sp.?) Unidentified, large, Lupine (Lupinus sp.). Medicinal herbs included: Pata de Guanaco (Calandrinia grandiflora) along with some wilds plants: Various Grasses (Poaceae), Colliguay (Colliguaja odifera), Espino (Acacia caven), Lengua de Gato (Galium sp.), Sedge (Cyperus sp.), and  Chenopod (Chenopodium sp.).

Central and Southern Argentina

La Pampa 
There are a series of 5 sites (1,3,5, La Lomita) located in the La Pampa region of Argentina that demonstrate the historical presence of pre-Hispanic hunter-gatherers and farming cultures in west-central Argentina in the period of the Upper Holocene to the Lower Holocene. Food residues were analyzed from 23 sherds from pottery obtained from these sites. The following food and plant materials were found on the internal and external surface of the sherds: Zea mays (corn), Prosopis, Poaceae phytoliths, and Fungal zoospores and hyphae. These findings suggest that there was some trading between agricultural groups of Andean region, in South-central Chile, with and the hunter-gathers of La Pampa.

West-Central Patagonia 
There are two sites of interest for studying hunter gatherers in the Holocene in West-central Patagonia; these sites include the cave sites of El Chueco 1 (11,500–180 cal BP) and Baño Nuevo 1 (10,800–3,000 cal BP). The El Chueco 1 cave is located at 44°29′36′′S; 71°11′13′′W. The Baño Nuevo is located at 45º17′ S, 71º32′ W. The west-central Patagonia region where these sites are located typically have a dry climate. The average rainfall for this area is 400 mm and the average temperature is 7 °C. With regard to the stability of the region, "palaeoenvironmental reconstructions for the region indicate no major changes in the distribution of vegetation since approximately 8,000 calBP." Samples for these two sites gathered information about plant micro-remains from the Pleistocene-Holocene transition to the Late Holocene. The number of different types of plants from the stratigraphy sampled varied between the two sites, with EC1 exhibiting fewer plant micro-remains in the Early Holocene with a fairly steady increase into the Late Holocene, while BN1 exhibited a greater range of plant micro-remains in the Early Holocene and there was a steady decline in percentage of plant micro-remains in the sample.  The micro-remains of the plants suggest that the following plants were in use at these sites: Alstroemeriaceae, Apiaceae, Apiaceae, Berberis, Brassicaceae, Brassicaceae, Calceolariaceae, Carex sp., Chenopodiaceae, Convolvulaceae, Cyperus sp., Cyperaceae, Eleocharis sp., Ericaceae, Fabaceae, Fragaria chiloensis, Galium sp., Lamiaceae, Libertia sp., Malvaceae, Phacelia sp., Poaceae, Polygonaceae, Portulaceae, Rubus sp., Scirpus sp., and Uncinia sp. with a large number of the plants samples unable to be identified.

Sierras de Córdoba 
In Central Argentina, there is some evidence of agriculture in the region by 1000 BP. The Sierras de Córdoba, in Central Argentina, are west of the modern city of Córdoba and east of the Andean range separating Argentina from Chile. In one study, 15 sites in the Sierras de Córdoba were analyzed for plant macroremains and microremains. The following results were obtained from the Late Holocene and into the Pre-Columbian period.  Quebrada Norte 7: Sracomphalus mistol, Lithraea molloides, Zea mays, Condalia sp., Prosopis sp., Schinua cf. areria, Phaseolus sp., Chenopodium quinoa var. quinoa, C. quinoa cf. var. melanospermum, Amaranthus sp.; Pozancón 1: Solanum cf. tuberosum, cf. Ipomea/Manihot.; Casa del Sol 8: Zea mays.; El Alto 3: Polylepis autralis, Maytenus boaria.; Quebrada del Real 1: Chenopodium sp., Zea mays.; Cruz Chiquita 3: Zea mays.; Río Yuspe 11: Sarcomphalus mistol.; Boyo Paso 2: Sarcomphalus mistol, Zea mays, Phaseolus vulgaris, Prosopis sp., Oxalis sp.; Yaco Pampa 1: Zea mays, cf. Prosopis sp.;  Arroyo Tala Cañada 1: Zea mays, Cucurbita sp., Phaseolus vulgaris, P. lunatus.; Arroyo Talainín 2: cf. Lithraea molloides.; C.Pun.39: Prosopis sp., Chenopodium/Amaranthus sp., Zea mays, P. vulgaris, P. lunatis, Cucurbita sp.; Río Yuspe 14:  Sarcomphalus mistol.; Puesto la Esquina 1: Zea mays, P. vulgaris var. vulgaris, P vulgaris var. aborigineus, P. lunatus.; Cerco de la Cueva Pintada: cf. Prosopis sp.; Arroyo Tala Huasi: Zea mays.

Contemporary Mapuche ethnobotany 

Plant use from modern ethnographic data:

Modern ethnobotany of the Selk'nam 

Plant use from Tierra del Fuego based on modern ethnographic data:

References

Mapuche history
Ethnobotany
Hunter-gatherers
Indigenous peoples of South America
History of agriculture
Selk'nam people
Excavations
Prehistory of South America
History of agriculture in Chile
Archaeology of Argentina